is the ninth single by Japanese recording artist Aya Ueto. It was released on July 28, 2004 as the second single from Ueto's third studio album Re..

Overview 

"Afuresō na Ai, Daite/Namida o Fuite" is a double A-side single released only a month after "Kaze/Okuru Kotoba." Like "Kaze" before it, "Afuresō na Ai, Daite" was written by Yoshiko Miura, composed by Tetsurō Oda, and arranged by Nobuyuki Shimizu. The song was used in commercials for the Lotte ice cream Soh, starring Ueto herself. CDJournal described it as an "unusual breakup song" and complimented its "literally fresh melody," while Barks likened the song to Seiko Matsuda's 1980 hit "Aoi Sangoshō," which was also written by Miura.

The second A-side, "Namida o Fuite," which coincidentally shares the same title as Ueto's first TV drama, was written by singer-songwriter Tadashi Hirosawa and composed and arranged by music producer Sin. The song served as theme song for the animation film Konjiki no Gash Bell!! Movie 1: Unlisted Demon 101. At a press conference for the movie, Ueto commented, "I always dreamed of having one of my songs play in a movie, so I'm thrilled." The single also includes a re-arranged version of "Personal," which previously served as the first ending theme for the Konjiki no Gash Bell!! anime series.

For a chance to win one of the 300 copies issued of the official remix CD "Kaze: Home Grown Mix", a special campaign for purchasers of both "Kaze/Okuru Kotoba" and "Afuresō na Ai, Daite/Namida o Fuite" was held until August 31, 2004.

Chart performance 
"Afuresō na Ai, Daite/Namida o Fuite" debuted on the Oricon Daily Singles chart at number 10, where it remained for three consecutive days, starting July 27, 2004. It peaked at number 10 on the Oricon Weekly Singles chart, with 18,672 copies sold in its first week. The single charted for eight weeks and has sold a total of 33,723 copies.

Track listing

Charts

Release history

References 

2004 singles
Aya Ueto songs
Songs written by Tetsurō Oda
Japanese film songs
Songs written for animated films
Songs written by Sin (music producer)
Song recordings produced by Sin (music producer)